Supercavitation is the use of a cavitation bubble to reduce skin friction drag on a submerged object and enable high speeds. Applications include torpedoes and propellers, but in theory, the technique could be extended to an entire underwater vessel.

Physical principle

Cavitation is the formation of vapour bubbles in liquid caused by flow around an object. Bubbles form when water accelerates around sharp corners and the pressure drops below the vapour pressure. Pressure increases upon deceleration, and the water generally reabsorbs the vapour; however, vapour bubbles can implode and apply small concentrated impulses that may damage surfaces like ship propellers and pump impellers.

The potential for vapour bubbles to form in a liquid is given by the nondimensional cavitation number. It equals local pressure minus vapour pressure, divided by dynamic pressure. At increasing depths (or pressures in piping), the potential for cavitation is lower because the difference between local pressure and vapour pressure is greater.

A supercavitating object is a high-speed submerged object that is designed to initiate a cavitation bubble at its nose. The bubble extends (either naturally or augmented with internally generated gas) past the aft end of the object and prevents contact between the sides of the object and the liquid. This separation substantially reduces the skin friction drag on the supercavitating object.

A key feature of the supercavitating object is the nose, which typically has a sharp edge around its perimeter to form the cavitation bubble.  The nose may be articulated and shaped as a flat disk or cone. The shape of the supercavitating object is generally slender so the cavitation bubble encompasses the object. If the bubble is not long enough to encompass the object, especially at slower speeds, the bubble can be enlarged and extended by injecting high-pressure gas near the object's nose.

The very high speed required for supercavitation can be temporarily reached by underwater-fired projectiles and projectiles entering water. For sustained supercavitation, rocket propulsion is used, and the high-pressure rocket gas can be routed to the nose to enhance the cavitation bubble. In principle, supercavitating objects can be maneuvered using various methods, including the following:

 Drag fins that project through the bubble into the surrounding liquid (p. 22) 
 A tilted object nose
 Gas injected asymmetrically near the nose to distort the cavity's geometry
 Vectoring rocket thrust through gimbaling for a single nozzle
 Differential thrust from multiple nozzles

Applications
The Russian Navy developed the VA-111 Shkval supercavitation torpedo, which uses rocket propulsion and exceeds the speed of conventional torpedoes by at least a factor of five. NII-24 began development in 1960 under the code name "Шквал" (Squall). The VA-111 Shkval has been in service (exclusively in the Russian Navy) since 1977 with mass production starting in 1978. Several models were developed, with the most successful, the M-5, completed by 1972. From 1972 to 1977, over 300 test launches were conducted (95% of them on Issyk Kul lake).

In 2006, German weapons manufacturer Diehl BGT Defence announced their own supercavitating torpedo, the Barracuda, now officially named .

In 1994, the United States Navy began development of the Rapid Airborne Mine Clearance System (RAMICS), a sea mine clearance system invented by C Tech Defense Corporation. The system is based on a supercavitating projectile stable in both air and water. In 2000 at Aberdeen Proving Ground, RAMICS projectiles fired from a hovering Sea Cobra gunship successfully destroyed a range of live underwater mines. As of March 2009, Northrop Grumman completed the initial phase of RAMICS testing for introduction into the fleet.

Iran claimed to have successfully tested its first supercavitation torpedo, the Hoot (Whale), on 2–3 April 2006. Some sources have speculated it is based on the Russian VA-111 Shkval supercavitation torpedo, which travels at the same speed. Russian Foreign Minister Sergey Lavrov denied supplying Iran with the technology.

In 2004, DARPA announced the Underwater Express program, a research and evaluation program to demonstrate the use of supercavitation for a high-speed underwater craft application. The US Navy's ultimate goal is a new class of underwater craft for littoral missions that can transport small groups of navy personnel or specialized military cargo at speeds up to 100 knots. DARPA awarded contracts to Northrop Grumman and General Dynamics Electric Boat in late 2006. In 2009, DARPA announced progress on a new class of submarine:

A prototype ship named the Ghost, uses supercavitation to propel itself atop two struts with sharpened edges. It was designed for stealth operations by Gregory Sancoff of Juliet Marine Systems. The vessel rides smoothly in choppy water and has reached speeds of 29 knots.

The Chinese Navy and US Navy are reportedly working on their own supercavitating submarines using technical information obtained on the Russian VA-111 Shkval supercavitation torpedo.

A supercavitating propeller uses supercavitation to reduce water skin friction and increase propeller speed. The design is used in military applications, high-performance racing boats, and model racing boats. It operates fully submerged with wedge-shaped blades to force cavitation on the entire forward face, starting at the leading edge. Since the cavity collapses well behind the blade, the supercavitating propeller avoids spalling damage caused by cavitation, which is a problem with conventional propellers.

Supercavitating ammunition is used with German (Heckler & Koch P11) and Russian underwater firearms, and other similar weapons.

Alleged incidents
The Kursk submarine disaster was initially thought to have been caused by a faulty Shkval supercavitating torpedo, though later evidence points to a faulty 65-76 torpedo.

See also
Supercavitating torpedo
"Shkval" supercavitating torpedo
APS amphibious rifle
SPP-1 underwater pistol
Supercavitating propeller

References

Further reading
Office of Naval Research (2004, June 14). Mechanics and energy conversion: high-speed (supercavitating) undersea weaponry (D&I). Retrieved April 12, 2006, from Office of Naval Research Home Page
Savchenko Y. N. (n.d.). CAV 2001 - Fourth Annual Symposium on Cavitation - California Institute of Technology Retrieved April 9, 2006, archived at Wayback Machine
Hargrove, J. (2003). Supercavitation and aerospace technology in the development of high-speed underwater vehicles. In 42nd AIAA Aerospace Sciences Meeting and Exhibit. Texas A&M University.
Kirschner et al. (2001, October) Supercavitation research and development. Undersea Defense Technologies
Miller, D. (1995). Supercavitation: going to war in a bubble. Jane's Intelligence Review. Retrieved Apr 14, 2006, from Defence & Security Intelligence & Analysis | Jane's 360
Graham-Rowe, & Duncan. (2000). Faster than a speeding bullet. NewScientist, 167(2248), 26–30.
Tulin, M. P. (1963). Supercavitating flows - small perturbation theory. Laurel, Md, Hydronautics Inc.
Niam J W (Dec 2014), Numerical Simulation Of Supercavitation

External links
Supercavitation Research Group at the University of Minnesota
Diehl BGT Defence's "Barracuda" - a German supercavitating Torpedo
DARPA Underwater Express Program
Global Security.org on Supercavitation
How to Build a Supercavitating Weapon, Scientific American

Fluid dynamics